Vuno is a village in Himara municipality, Vlorë County, Albania. It is located along the road between the municipal centre of Himarë and the village of Dhërmi in the Albanian Riviera.

Name

History
The region was inhabited by the Chaonians in the ancient period.

In 1628 a school was founded in Vuno by Catholic missionary Neofit Rodino. The latter was sent to Himara region in order to convert the local Greek Orthodox element to Catholicism. In 1632 an Albanian-language school was founded in Vuno.

In 1720, the villages of Himara, Palasa, Ilias, Vuno, Pilur and Qeparo refused to submit to the Pasha of Delvina.

In 1873 a Greek school with 80 pupils was already operating in the village. Greek education was expanded the following years and in the 1898-1899 school season three schools were operating in Vuno: a primary, a secondary (Hellenic) and a girls' school. Education was sponsored by various distinguished personalities and the diaspora members who originated from Vuno, as well as from adjacent settlements. These schools appear to have ceased their operation in 1913. Greek school classes in Vuno were housed in an imposing building, however after the incorporation of the village in the newly established Principality of Albania, Greek education was prohibited by state policies.

During the First Balkan War, on 5/18 November 1912, Himara revolted under Spyros Spyromilios and expelled the Ottoman forces. Vuno was captured by the Greek military body of Stylianos Galeros on 6 November 1912 After the Albanian Declaration of Independence in Vlorë, on 28 November, Himarë was constantly attacked by Albanian units without success and the area remained under Greek control until the end of the Balkan Wars. Upon the Greek Army evacuation from Himara, the locals undertook the defense of the region. The Himariotes rebels were joined by volunteers from neighbouring villages and defectors of the army, that set up points on the roads leading to Himara and continued the resistance. Athanasios Liampou Kotsou commanded a volunteer band and the residents in Vuno. The rebel bands in Vuno were assisted by a Greek revolutionary band numbering 55 fighters commanded by guerrilla leader Georgios Tsolakes. The Vuno troops were unable to enter Vranisht on 30 June due to strong Albanian resistance, but they managed to capture it the next day. Tsolakes and other Himariote leaders were later killed in action.

The Himara region came under the control of the Albanian state. The Himara question in 1921, regarding the rights of "Himariots" and their villages Dhërmi, Vuno, Himarë, Pilur, Kudhës and Qeparo, was supervised by Albanian government representative Spiro Jorgo Koleka. The government concluded that Albanian was obligatory in school, as the official language, while Greek was free to be taught as a second language, as desired by the people. Spiro Koleka, a native of Vuno and a local leader of the Albanian national movement opposed the Himara area and wider region around Vlora being annexed by foreign powers. To that effect Koleka was an organiser of the Vlora War, where other local Himariots participated.

With the incorporation of the region in Albania (1920s) the inhabitants of Vuno kept their Greek school and in 1934-36 asked for the continuation of Greek education in their village but their demand was rejected by the authorities of the Albanian state.

During the Greco-Italian War on 30 December 1940, the Italians stopped a Greek attack on Bënçë, Vuno and Bolenë. On 15 January 1941, the Italians stopped a Greek attack on Vuno, while the Greeks attacked the Dishnicë region. A military cemetery of the fallen Greek soldiers is maintained at Scutara.

A number of locals joined the Albanian National Liberation Army, as guerilla fighters during World War II. Three of them were posthumously awarded with the People's Hero of Albania decoration. The most well known of them was Zaho Koka, the others were Kozma Nushi and Llambro Andoni. Other participants, whose names are also engraved on the village memorial were Arqile Vjero, Amali Andoni, Eftihi Baka, Foto Goxho, Herkole Koleka, Irakli Thani, Llambro Sheti, Kleomen A. Ndrenika, Niqita Andoni, Naço Koço, Pano Dhimegjoka, Pilo Varfi, Stefo Cura, Thoma Simo. Vuno formed also the core region in which Greek Himariotes were organized in the Albanian National Liberation Army.

During the 1997 civil disorder in Albania, an armed group set up a roadblock between Himarë and Vuno.

Architecture and churches
The village has many churches, but they are not operational as currently there are no priests in the village.

The church located at the Jali beach, dating to the 14th century, of Venetian architectural style. Two other churches, dedicated respectively to St. Spyridon's Church (1778) and to St. Mary (1783) are still relatively well preserved. Local legend holds that the inhabitants of the village hail from the city of Shkodër and moved to Vuno, where they built the church of St. Mary. The church is still well preserved at a salient point of the village, called Scutara. The name Scutara possibly reflects the Byzantine military traditions of the Pronoia which was widely known in the wider region. This church was originally Catholic but was subsequently converted into Orthodox.

Attractions
The beaches of Vuno together with the ones of Himara represent the main tourist attraction of the municipality during the summer months. The beach of Jaliskari (or Jali), between Vuno and Dhërmi, has become a well-known summer resort attracting tourists all over the world.

Identity and language
The village of Vuno is mainly inhabited by Albanian-speaking Eastern Orthodox Christians. In his fieldwork anthropologist V. Nitsiakos (2010) notes that they are proud of their strong Orthodox Christian identity, they have friendly feelings towards Greece, and their pro-Greek attitude may also be related to provision of employment opportunities in Greece, while the elderly are recipients of Greek pensions as Hellenes. The Albanian local dialect is a southern Tosk one, more precisely a Labërisht sub-dialect. Labërisht itself is composed of non-unical language groups. In contemporary times the village elderly are monolingual Albanian speakers, whereas due to migration to Greece, some of the younger people also speak Greek.

Vuno is one of the villages of Himara region inhabited by an Orthodox Albanian population.

Gallery

Notable people
 
 
Dhimitër Anagnosti,Albanian cineast, and former Minister of Culture, Youth and Sports
Odhise Grillo, Albanian writer
Zaho Koka, member of Albanian Albanian National Liberation Movement
Spiro Jorgo (Gogo) Koleka (1879 or 1880–1940) prominent Albanian politician and activist
Spiro Koleka, (1908 – 2001) Albanian communist politician and a partisan
Anastas Kondo, Albanian writer
Sofokli Lazri, counselor of Enver Hoxha and writer
Robert Ndrenika,Albanian actor
Gogo Nushi, Albanian political figure and World War II hero
Athanasios Pipis (−1821), revolutionary of the Greek War of Independence
Leandro Zoto, Albanian politician and former mayor of Tirana

References

Sources

External links

 
Populated places in Himara
Villages in Vlorë County